Edward Masters (died 1881) was a New Zealand member of parliament.

Edward Masters (or Ed Masters or Eddie Masters) may also refer to:

Edward Masters (died 1691), English MP
Edward Masters (mountain biker)
Edward E. Masters, American diplomat